Liam Lynch may refer to:

Liam Lynch (Irish republican) (1893–1923), general in the Irish Republican Army
Liam Lynch (musician) (born 1970), American musician, writer, and movie director